Yuriy Kostenko (born 6 December 1951) is a Ukrainian politician and leader of the Ukrainian People's Party.

Biography
Kostenko holds a Ph.D from the Zaporizhia Institute of Machine-building. In 1989, he became one of the founders of Rukh and has been a Member of the Verkhovna Rada (Parliament) since 1990 (except in 2006). In 2002 as a member of Our Ukraine. From 1992 to 1998 he served as the minister of environmental protection. Kostenko was a candidate at the 1999 Ukrainian presidential election where he received 2.17% of votes. Kostenko was involved in Ukraine’s nuclear disarmament, which he later regretted, and in dealing with the aftermath of the Chernobyl disaster.

Before the parliamentary elections in 2006 Kostenko initiated the creation of a coalition known as Ukrainian National Bloc of Kostenko and Plyushch who has acquired 1.9% of the vote and did not exceed the 3% threshold of the election.

In July 2007 Kostenko and Ivan Plyushch joined together the block Our Ukraine–People's Self-Defense Bloc and both got re-elected as MP. Unlike many allies of Yushchenko, Kostenko did not defected from the Our Ukraine grouping in parliament.

Kostenko was a candidate in the 2010 presidential election, his party program included recognizing Ukrainian Insurgent Army veterans, during the election he received 0,22% of the votes.

Kostenko's Ukrainian People's Party competed on one single party under "umbrella" party Our Ukraine in the 2012 Ukrainian parliamentary election, together with Congress of Ukrainian Nationalists; this list won 1.11% of the national votes and no constituencies and thus failed to win parliamentary representation. Kostenko was second the election list of Our Ukraine. He did not participate in the 2014 Ukrainian parliamentary election.

References

External links
Official website of the Ukrainian People's Party

1951 births
Living people
People from Vinnytsia Oblast
Ukrainian People's Party politicians
People's Movement of Ukraine politicians
First convocation members of the Verkhovna Rada
Second convocation members of the Verkhovna Rada
Third convocation members of the Verkhovna Rada
Fourth convocation members of the Verkhovna Rada
Sixth convocation members of the Verkhovna Rada
Candidates in the 1999 Ukrainian presidential election
Candidates in the 2010 Ukrainian presidential election
Preservation of natural environment and nuclear safety ministers of Ukraine
Preservation of natural environment ministers of Ukraine
Zaporizhzhya National Technical University alumni